The Claremont Parkway station, signed as "Claremont Parkway − Between 171st St. & 172nd St." was a local station on the demolished IRT Third Avenue Line in the Bronx, New York City. It originally opened on September 19, 1888 by the Suburban Rapid Transit Company as Wendover Avenue Station, and had three tracks and two side platforms. It was the northern terminus of the Third Avenue elevated until 1891. It was also two blocks east of the former Claremont Park New York Central Railroad station along the Harlem Line that was closed in 1960. The next stop to the north was 174th Street. The next stop to the south was 169th Street. The station closed on April 29, 1973. Claremont Parkway station burned down on April 30, 1973 in a huge arson fire.

References

External links

IRT Third Avenue Line stations
Railway stations in the United States opened in 1888
Railway stations closed in 1973
1888 establishments in New York (state)
1973 disestablishments in New York (state)
Former elevated and subway stations in the Bronx
Third Avenue